Pterygoplichthys etantaculatus, is a species of armored catfish.

Distribution and habitat
This species is present in Brazil. It lives in freshwater of the São Francisco River basin.

Description
This species grows to a length of about  SL.

References

External links
 Planet Catfish

Hypostominae
Fish of the São Francisco River basin
Fish described in 1829